Klampenborgbanen is the shortest (13.3 km from København H) of six radial S-train lines in Copenhagen. It runs parallel to the Kystbanen regional line from central Copenhagen until Klampenborg, and serves residential neighbourhoods in eastern Gentofte as well as popular recreational destinations at Klampenborg such as Dyrehavsbakken and Jægersborg Dyrehave.

Stations

Service patterns
The Klampenborg radial is served by trains on service C, which stop at all stations.

Before 1979 the main service to Klampenborg was service A. Historically, service on the Klampenborg radial has often been reinforced in busy periods by ring line trains continuing northwards from Hellerup. This practice has been abandoned (so far) with the 2007 timetable; instead the frequency of the main C service is doubled most of the day.

History
Klampenborgbanen opened in 1863 as a branch line from Nordbanen. The branch was completed several months ahead of the main line, because the private railway company wanted to profit as much as possible from the summer season of 1863. The line was primarily a "picnic railway"; its terminus at Klampenborg was close to the attractions such as Dyrehavsbakken amusement park, the Jægersborg Dyrehave forest and the Bellevue beach. The expectations were met: the railway was an immense success from day one.

The original route south of Hellerup was different from the current one; see Nordbanen for details.
In 1897 Klampenborgbanen between Hellerup and Klampenborg became part of Kystbanen from Copenhagen to Helsingør. Over the years it became difficult to run both the local trains to Klampenborg and the Helsingør trains on the same two tracks, and a dedicated local double track from Hellerup to Klampenborg was built in 1928.

Because of the large outing traffic (as late as 1950 Sundays were far busier than weekdays on the Klampenborg branch) Klampenborgbanen was a natural first choice when the decision to electrify the local rail traffic around Copenhagen was taken, and the first S-trains ran in 1934. Since then little has changed. As much of the population has moved out from the city center the Sunday traffic has become less important, but at the same time the line has gained a modest commuter patronage on weekdays.

S-train (Copenhagen) lines